PP-150 Lahore-VII is a Constituency of Provincial Assembly of Punjab.

General elections 2008
Rana Tajamul Hussain won the elections for the seat of MPA from PP 157 in 2013 Elections.

General elections 2002
By the general elections of 2002 Mr.Naveed Ashiq Diyal won the seat of MPA.

See also
 PP-149 Lahore-VI
 PP-151 Lahore-VIII

References

External links
 Election commission Pakistan's official website
 Awazoday.com check result
 Official Website of Government of Punjab

Constituencies of Punjab, Pakistan